Gildo Pallanca Pastor (born 1 April 1967) is a Monegasque businessman, CEO and owner of Venturi.

Early life
Gildo Pallanca Pastor was born in Monaco, the son of Claude Pallanca and the heiress and businesswoman Hélène Pastor. He has a sister, Sylvia Pastor.

He studied law in France, economic sciences in Italy and real estate construction at the Massachusetts Institute of Technology in Cambridge in the United States.

Career
Gildo Pallanca Pastor purchased Venturi in 2001. He also manages the Pastor family's commercial real estate business, a radio station, and about 15 start-up ventures. Since 2015 he has been Monaco's Consul General to the United States.

His mother, "the senior surviving member of what is, in effect, Monaco’s second dynasty after the ruling Grimaldis", was murdered in May 2014. Her son-in-law was convicted of the murder in 2018. As she had a net worth of $3.7 billion and two children, he became a billionaire.

Honours
In 2009, Prince Albert II of Monaco made him a Knight of the Order of Saint-Charles.

Personal life
Pastor is married with children and lives in Monaco.

References 

1967 births
Living people
Massachusetts Institute of Technology alumni
Monegasque businesspeople
Monegasque billionaires
Knights of the Order of Saint-Charles
Gildo
People of Ligurian descent
Consuls
Chief executive officers